Scudderia pistillata is a species in the family Tettigoniidae ("katydids"), in the order Orthoptera ("grasshoppers, crickets, katydids"). A common name for Scudderia pistillata is "broad-winged bush katydid".
Scudderia pistillata is found in North America.

References

Further reading
 
 Field Guide To Grasshoppers, Katydids, And Crickets Of The United States, Capinera, Scott, Walker. 2004. Cornell University Press.
 Otte, Daniel (1997). Tettigonioidea. Orthoptera Species File 7, 373.

Scudderia
Insects described in 1878